Thor Munkager (31 March 1951 in Copenhagen – 4 December 2017) was a Danish handball player who competed in the 1972 Summer Olympics and in the 1976 Summer Olympics.

He played his club handball with Helsingør IF, playing alongside Torben Winther. In 1972 he was part of the Denmark men's national handball team which finished thirteenth in the Olympic tournament. He played two matches and scored four goals. Four years later he finished eighth with the Danish team in the 1976 Olympic tournament. He played four matches.

He was the assistant coach of the Danish national team under head coach Torben Winther.

References

1951 births
2017 deaths
Danish male handball players
Danish handball coaches
Olympic handball players of Denmark
Handball players at the 1972 Summer Olympics
Handball players at the 1976 Summer Olympics
Handball players from Copenhagen